Chantelle Handy (born 16 June 1987) is a basketball player for Caledonia Gladiators of the WBBL. She has also played for the Great Britain national team and was part of the squad for the 2012 Summer Olympics. She played college basketball in the United States at Marshall University in Huntington, West Virginia.

Marshall statistics

Source

References

External links
Marshall University bio

1987 births
Living people
Basketball players at the 2012 Summer Olympics
British expatriate basketball people in Belgium
British expatriate basketball people in Greece
British expatriate basketball people in Spain
British expatriate basketball people in the United States
British women's basketball players
Marshall Thundering Herd women's basketball players
Olympic basketball players of Great Britain
Sportspeople from County Durham